Feast is the fourteenth album by the Canadian heavy metal band Annihilator, released on August 23, 2013 by UDR in Europe and August 27, 2013 in North America. The cover art of the album features Spanish model and presenter Pilar Rubio.

The album is the final to feature vocalist Dave Padden, who parted ways with the band at the end of 2014, ending his decade-plus long tenure. The decision came after Padden became fed up with Annihilator's rigorous touring schedule that followed the album's release, leaving him wanting to spend more time with his family.

Track listing
Standard edition

Personnel

Jeff Waters - guitars, bass and backing vocals
Dave Padden - lead/backing vocals, guitars
Mike Harshaw - drums
Alberto Campuzano - bass (not on the album)
Danko Jones - lead vocals on "Wrapped"

Chart positions

References

Annihilator (band) albums
2013 albums